Kawnglanghpu is a town in the Kachin State of north-east Burma. It is the principal town in the Kawnglanghpu Township in Putao District.

Geography 
Kawnglangphu is located in far-north of Burma, Kachin State. The town very ghostly and surrounded by snow-capped mountains of Kachin State.

External links
Satellite map at Maplandia.com

Township capitals of Myanmar
Populated places in Kachin State